Charles Daniel Balvo (born June 29, 1951) is an American prelate of the Roman Catholic Church who has been serving in diplomatic service of the Holy See since 1987. His current posting is as apostolic nuncio to Australia. He has been an apostolic nuncio and archbishop since 2005.

Biography

Early years 
A native of Brooklyn, Balvo grew up in Suffern, New York, where he graduated from Sacred Heart School. He studied at the Cathedral College of the Immaculate Conception, both in Manhattan and in Queens.

Balvo studied for the priesthood at the Pontifical North American College in Rome, obtaining a Bachelor of Sacred Theology degree and a Licentiate of Biblical Theology at the Pontifical Gregorian University. Balvo served at Sacred Heart parish in Newburgh, New York, from 1976 to 1981, and then at St. John the Evangelist in Mahopac, New York, for a year. Balvo obtained his Licentiate of Canon Law at the Catholic University of America in Washington, D.C. and his Doctor of Canon Law degree at the Gregorian University.

Diplomatic corps 
On April 1, 2005, Balvo was appointed titular archbishop of Castello and apostolic nuncio to New Zealand, Fiji, the Marshall Islands, Kiribati, the Federated States of Micronesia, Tonga, Palau and Vanuatu. He received his episcopal consecration from Cardinal Edward Egan on June 29, 2005. The Cook Islands were added to Balvo's responsibilities on March 25, 2006, Samoa on April 1, 2006, and Nauru on January 30, 2007.

Balvo was appointed as apostolic nuncio to Kenya on January, 17, 2013, as well as permanent observer to United Nations Organizations for the Environment and Human Settlements (UNEP and UN-Habitat). After Kenyan Cardinal John Njue denounced US President Barack Obama's call for Kenya to protect LGBT rights, Balvo told an audience of Kenyan Catholics that: "The homosexuals should be defended against violation of their dignity and human rights, they are human beings like anyone of us".

On December 21, 2013, Balvo was appointed the first apostolic nuncio to South Sudan as well. Speaking on the South Sudanese civil war, Balvo said civil society needs to be involved not just in negotiations on the government level but “should be actively involved always.” Speaking to CISA news agency February 17,  he said civil society and the church have already asked the warring factions to lay down their arms and work out their differences, adding that in the end it is the people who are suffering. "In a country that has a lot of resources, it will not be easy to develop them unless there is peace," he said. He said the church was doing much to help people through promotion of their welfare and would continue to ensure that peace prevails in the nation. "It is very hard to promote and create a society with generations of people that all they have known is violence," he said.

On September 21, 2018, Pope Francis named Balvo as apostolic nuncio to the Czech Republic and then transferred him to the post of apostolic nuncio to Australia on January, 17, 2022.

Notes

See also
 List of heads of the diplomatic missions of the Holy See

References
 

21st-century American Roman Catholic titular archbishops
Living people
1951 births
People from Brooklyn
American Roman Catholics
Pontifical Ecclesiastical Academy alumni
Pontifical Gregorian University alumni
Apostolic Nuncios to Kenya
Permanent Observers of the Holy See to UNEP and UN-HABITAT
Apostolic Nuncios to South Sudan
Apostolic Nuncios to the Czech Republic
Catholic University of America alumni
Apostolic Nuncios to New Zealand
Apostolic Nuncios to Fiji
Apostolic Nuncios to Palau
Apostolic Nuncios to Nauru
Apostolic Nuncios to Kiribati
Apostolic Nuncios to Tonga
Apostolic Nuncios to Vanuatu
Apostolic Nuncios to the Cook Islands
Apostolic Nuncios to the Federated States of Micronesia
Apostolic Nuncios to the Marshall Islands
Apostolic Nuncios to Samoa
Apostolic Nuncios to the Pacific Ocean
Catholics from New York (state)
Apostolic Nuncios to Australia